Dancin' in the Key of Life is the debut solo studio album (not including two albums released earlier in the decade with Steve Arrington's Hall of Fame) by American R&B/soul singer Steve Arrington. It was released in 1985 via Atlantic Records, and was produced by Keg Johnson and Wilmer Raglin. The album peaked at number 185 on the Billboard 200 and number 32 on the Top R&B/Hip-Hop Albums. Its self-titled lead single peaked at #68 on the Hot 100 and #8 on the Hot R&B/Hip-Hop Songs.

Track listing

2022 CD Reissue Bonus Tracks

Personnel
Steve Arrington: Main Vocal, Vocal Backing, Keyboards
India Arrington, Dani Johnson, Marti McCall, Pattie Brooks, Michael Terry, Wilmer Raglin: Vocal Backing
George Johnson: Guitars and Electric Bass
Eric Williams: Guitars
Anthony Johnson, Carlos Murguia, William F. Zimmerman, Joey Gallo, Ramsey Embick: Keyboards
Paulinho Da Costa: Percussion
Freddie Hubbard: Trumpet
Stella Castellucci: Harp

Charts

References

External links 

1985 albums
Atlantic Records albums